Fréro Delavega is the 2014 self-titled album of the French musical duo Fréro Delavega and their official debut studio album. The 18-track album released on 18 July 2014 on Capitol Music France appeared at number one of SNEP, the official French Albums Chart, also becoming a hit in Belgium.

Track list
CD1
 "Il y a" (3:03)
 "Sweet Darling" (2:42)
 "Le Chant des sirènes" (2:58)
 "Même si c'est très loin" (2:41)
 "Mon héroïne" (2:37)
 "Mon petit pays" (3:13)
 "Que toi" (2:38)
 "Reviens" (3:13)
 "Tour de chance" (2:59)
 "Sur la route" (2:45)
 "Queenstone" (3:02)
 "De l'autre côté" (3:40)
CD2
 "Onde sensuelle" (3:10)
 "Price Tag" (2:54)
 "Save Tonight" (3:02)
 "Soulstorm" (3:48)
 "Sexy Bitch" (3:21)
 "Caroline" (3:12)

Charts

Weekly charts

Year-end charts

References

2014 debut albums